The following are the national records in Olympic weightlifting in Libya. Records are maintained in each weight class for the snatch lift, clean and jerk lift, and the total for both lifts by the Libyan Weightlifting Federation.

Men

Women

References

Libya
weightlifting